Romanians in the United Kingdom refers to the phenomenon of Romanian people moving to the United Kingdom as citizens or non-citizen immigrants, along with British citizens of Romanian ancestry. The number of Romanian-born people resident in the UK has risen from 83,168 at the time of the 2011 Census to an estimated 345,000 in 2020.

History, population, and settlement

The small number of Romanians that first arrived in Britain were primarily Jews fleeing persecution during the Second World War. The activities of the Romanian exiles started in 1941, through the effort of individuals such as Ambassador Viorel Tilea, Major George Emil Iliescu, and legal counselor Ecaterina Iliescu. They founded the Anglo-Romanian Refugee Committee (ARRC) in 1948. The Free Romanian Orthodox Church was active in parallel to the ARRC between 1950 and 1955, under the leadership of Father Gildau, with a Parish Committee chaired by Mihai Carciog. This later transformed into the 'Romanian Orthodox Women's Association in the UK', which, in turn, became in 1956 the British-Romanian Association - also known under its Romanian name of ACARDA ("Asociația Culturală a Românilor din Anglia") - through the initiative of a representative group of individuals from the small Romanian community, including Ion Rațiu, Horia Georgescu, George Ross, and Leonard Kirschen, Marie-Jeanne Livezeanu, Gladys Wilson, Sanda Cârciog, and Mihai Cârciog.

Ion Rațiu was the President of the British-Romanian Association between 1965 and 1985, followed by Iolanda Costide between 1985 and 1996. Rațiu became honorary president of the organisation in 1985.

At the time of the 2001 Census, 7,631 Romanian-born people were residing in the UK. In the 2011 Census, the Romanian-born population grew to 83,168 people throughout the UK, with 79,687 in England & Wales, 2,387 in Scotland, and 1,094 in Northern Ireland. The Office for National Statistics (ONS) estimated that, in 2012, 101,000 Romanian-born people were resident in the UK. By 2019, this estimate had risen to 427,000. This estimate fell to 345,000 in 2020.

, approximately 1,067,200 Romanians had applied to the UK government's post-Brexit European Union Settlement Scheme. However, the ONS notes that not all applicants to the EUSS will be resident in the UK.

A particularly concentrated community exists in the Edgware-London suburb of Burnt Oak which has gained the nickname "Little Romania".

Culture
Most Romanians belong to the Romanian Orthodox Church religion and there are several Romanian Orthodox churches throughout the UK, such as those in Aberdeen, Ballymena, Birmingham, Boston, Bristol, Cambridge, Cardiff, Caterham, Edinburgh, Glasgow, Leeds, Liverpool, London, Luton, Northampton, Norwich, Nottingham, Oxford, or Poole.

Social issues
Around 75 per cent of women trafficked to the UK are from Romania, with the majority being victims of sexual exploitation. In October 2020, an online summit was held to discuss the problem. Ahead of the event, the chair of the All-Party Parliamentary Group on commercial sexual exploitation, Dame Diana Johnson, argued that "The industrial-scale sexual exploitation of Romanian women by UK men is a national scandal".

Romanians in the UK have faced discrimination and xenophobic abuse, and were targets of some hate crimes following the Brexit referendum. In the autumn of 2019, the Romanian government launched an advertising campaign to attract emigrants back to Romania, suggesting that a million jobs awaited them. In October 2019, Minister of Labour and Social Justice at the time Marius-Constantin Budăi told the ITV that he wished for all overseas Romanians to come home as soon as possible.

Notable Britons of Romanian descent

Ikechi Anya, footballer
Zeev Aram, furniture and interior designer (OBE)
Alma Cogan, singer
Jimmy Cornell, yachtsman, bestselling author of World Cruising Routes
Steven Berkoff, actor and author
John Bercow, politician
Maria Björnson, theatre designer 
Octav Botnar, businessman
Alexandra Bulat, academic and county councillor 
Alina Cojocaru, ballet dancer
George Constantinescu, scientist, engineer and inventor
Moses Gaster, scholar
Miron Grindea, literary journalist (OBE)
Rosemary Harris, actress
Michael Howard, politician
George Hurst, music conductor
George Iacobescu, chief executive of the Canary Wharf Group (CBE)
Irina Lăzăreanu, model
Jeff Leach, comedian
Anamaria Marinca, actress
Micachu, singer, songwriter and composer 
Nelly Miricioiu, opera singer
David Mitrany, scholar
Paul Neagu, artist
Emma Raducanu, tennis player (MBE)
Sir Roy Redgrave, army officer (KBE)
Ion Raţiu, politician
Solomon Schechter, rabbi
Constantin Silvestri, music conductor
Peter Solley, pianist
Martin Sorrell, businessman 
Monty Sunshine, jazz clarinetist
Viorel Tilea, diplomat (CBE)

Gallery

See also
Romania–United Kingdom relations
Romanian Americans

References

External links 
The Romanian Cultural Centre in London (website)
The Romanian Cultural Institute in London (website)
BBC Romania 1939–2008 

 
 
Immigration to the United Kingdom by country of origin
United Kingdom
Romanian minorities in Europe